The 2019–20 Ohio University Bobcats men's basketball team represented Ohio University for the 2019–20 NCAA Division I men's basketball season. The Bobcats were led by first-year head coach Jeff Boals, who was a 1995 graduate of Ohio University. The team played their home games at the Convocation Center in Athens, Ohio as a member of the East Division of the Mid-American Conference. They finished the season 17–15, 8–10 in MAC play to finish in last place in the East division. As the No. 8 seed in the MAC tournament, they defeated Central Michigan in the first round before the tournament was canceled due to the COVID-19 pandemic.

Previous season

The Bobcats finished the 2018–19 season 14–17, 6–12 in MAC play to finish in last place in the East Division. As the No. 10 seed in the MAC tournament, they were defeated in the first round by Northern Illinois.

On March 13, 2019, head coach Saul Phillips was fired. He finished his five-year tenure at Ohio with an 81–77 overall record. Five days later, the school named Ohio alum Jeff Boals, head coach at Stony Brook, as their new head coach.

Offseason

Coaching Staff Changes

Coaching Departures

Coaching Additions

Departures

Incoming transfers

Recruiting class

 Walk-on in 2019-20

Roster

Preseason

The preseason coaches' poll and league awards were announced by the league office on October 31, 2019.  Ohio was picked last in the MAC East.

Preseason rankings

East Division

West Division

MAC Tournament Champions: Bowling Green (6), Toledo (2), Buffalo (1), Kent State (1), Miami (1), NIU (1)

Source

Schedule and results

|-
!colspan=9 style=| Exhibition 

|-
!colspan=9 style=| Non-conference regular season

|-
!colspan=9 style=| MAC regular season

|-
!colspan=9 style=| MAC Tournament

All games from ohiobobcats.com.

Statistics

Team Statistics
Final 2019–20 Statistics

Source

Player statistics

Source

Awards and honors

Weekly Awards

All-MAC Awards 

Source

See also
2019–20 Ohio Bobcats women's basketball team

References

Ohio Bobcats men's basketball seasons
Ohio Bobcats men's basketball
Ohio
2020 in sports in Ohio